ARA Almirante Irízar is a large icebreaker of the Argentine Navy. She was ordered from a shipyard in Finland in 1975.

A fire broke out in her auxiliary generator compartment in 2007, putting her out of commission until April 2017.

Background

The ship was named after Julián Irízar. In 1903, when he held the rank of Lieutenant, he commanded the Argentine corvette  during a successful mission to rescue the Swedish Antarctic Expedition of Professor Otto Nordenskjöld, after the expedition had been trapped by the Antarctic winter.

The vessel was built at the Wärtsilä Helsinki Shipyard in Finland, under a contract signed in 1975 between the Argentine Navy and the shipyard. Irízar was launched in February 1978 and was formally commissioned on December that year, arriving in Argentina on 23 March 1979. She replaced the elderly icebreaker , which was then retired from active service.

Almirante Irízars peacetime missions include annual campaigns to resupply and rotate the personnel assigned to the Argentine Antarctic outposts, as well as conducting and supporting scientific endeavors in Antarctica. She has also conducted several passenger tours to Patagonia and the Antarctic.

The ship's homeport is at the Argentine Navy's Buenos Aires Naval Anchorage in the capital city of Buenos Aires.

Service

During the Falklands War the vessel served as troop transport on the 2 April operation and then as a hospital ship,  Helicopters departing from Almirante Irizar's helipad landed Argentine troops on Darwin and Fox Bay on 2 April 1982.

In April 1982, while operating north of the Falklands, the boilers of tanker ARA Punta Médanos failed and she lost all propulsion; Almirante Irízar towed her back to Puerto Madryn (about 330 miles west) in rough weather, the trip took about 60 hours. Punta Médanos couldn't be repaired, and was unable to continue operations during the war.

After the end of the war, she was converted into a hospital ship.

The ship gained attention in 2002, when she attempted to rescue the supply vessel Magdalena Oldendorff, which was trapped in pack ice off Antarctica. Even though Irízar failed to break Magdalena Oldendorff free, she managed to move it to a safer position and resupply the ship with food, medicine and medical personnel until the ice melted and Magdalena Oldendorff could return to open sea.

2004 incident
On 15/16 March 2004, the ship entered a maritime area designated as conservation zones under the jurisdiction of the Falkland Islands and issued demands for other ships to identify themselves. This prompted a protest from the British government to the Argentine government over its policing of seas under Falkland jurisdiction. The diplomatic note also re-asserted British sovereignty over the islands.

2007 fire
On 10 April 2007 at 22:00 UTC−03:00, a massive fire broke out in the auxiliary generator compartment. By midnight, captain Guillermo Tarapow had ordered the evacuation. Argentine Navy and Argentine Coast Guard aircraft, including P-3 Orion and Hercules C-130 aircraft, operated to keep track of the 24 lifeboats. The 296 persons aboard the icebreaker —including civilians of the Antarctic bases— were helped by the nearest ships, the Panamanian tanker Scarlet Ibis and a Uruguayan fishing vessel.

The crew arrived safely in Puerto Madryn on 12 April. There were no casualties.

The vessel's captain remained aboard alone for almost 24 hours after seeing his crew safely evacuated from the ship. Buzos Tacticos and members of the Rescue Team of the Argentine Navy boarded the ship and extinguished the fire. On 18 April, the ship started being towed to the Puerto Belgrano naval base. Irizar finally arrived to Puerto Belgrano on 20 April.

The fire caused the loss of the two Sea King helicopters stored in their hangar, worth  million each. These have been replaced by four Sea Kings transferred from the US government.

Following this incident the British government offered to supply Argentine bases in Antarctica in support of scientific missions, using . This offer was turned down by the Argentine government, instead they leased the Russian icebreaking vessel Vasily Golovnin for the subsequent Antarctic summer campaigns at a cost of US$2m/month. The Dutch cargo vessel Timca was hired for the 2012/13 campaign. Vasily Golovnin would again carry out the following Antarctic campaign.

Upgrade 

After a long period in Puerto Belgrano due to legal issues surrounding the incident, Irízar finally  arrived in Buenos Aires on 3 September 2008 to be taken to Tandanor's shipyard for repairs. Repairs were expected to be completed in 2010 but continued into 2011, and were supervised by Norwegian shipyard Aker Yards. , the refit had thus far cost over  million and the ship was not expected to be ready until late 2013. In , it was disclosed that the ship was still awaiting the necessary repairs and that sea trials had been delayed by a year, with oppositors claiming the money spent —some  million plus another  million in contracting supplying vessels—  could have been used to buy a new ship; a month later, it was announced that work regarding control panels was still pending.

This allows the ship to be used primarily as a research vessel in addition to its role of resupplying the southernmost Antarctic base Belgrano II. The diesel engines have been replaced by four new ones purchased from MAN in October 2011. The main radar of Irízar was also repaired in Argentina by CITEDEF. Work was initially estimated to be finished by November 2011, but it was not until April 2017 that the icebreaker was declared seaworthy again.

On 4 July, Almirante Irízar sailed for open sea trials for the first time in ten years. After departing Buenos Aires, the vessel headed to a dry dock in the main base of Argentine Navy, Puerto Belgrano, where the icebreaker underwent tests and verifications prior to ice trials in the Antarctic and return to full service.

In November 2017, the ship came back to Buenos Aires after successfully passing its "ice test", the last stage of its restoration work that left it ready for service again. It was confirmed that it will be present on the Antarctic 2018 campaign.

References

Further reading

External links

  

1978 ships
Falklands War naval ships of Argentina
Hospital ships during the Falklands War
Icebreakers of the Argentine Navy
Maritime incidents in 2004
Maritime incidents in 2007
Maritime incidents in Argentina
Ships built in Helsinki
Ship fires
Research vessels of Argentina